The 1904 United States presidential election in Georgia took place on November 8, 1904, as part of the wider United States presidential election. Voters chose 13 representatives, or electors, to the Electoral College, who voted for president and vice president.

Background
Following Reconstruction, Georgia would be the first former Confederate state to substantially disenfranchise its newly enfranchised freedmen, doing so in the early 1870s. This largely limited the Republican Party to a few North Georgia counties with substantial Civil War Unionist sentiment – chiefly Fannin but also to a lesser extent Pickens, Gilmer and Towns. The Democratic Party served as the guardian of white supremacy against a Republican Party historically associated with memories of Reconstruction, and the main competition became Democratic primaries, which state laws restricted to whites on the grounds of the Democratic Party being legally a private club.

However, politics after the first demobilization by a cumulative poll tax was chaotic. Third-party movements, chiefly the Populist Party, gained support amongst poor whites and the remaining black voters in opposition to the planter elite. The fact that Georgia had already substantially reduced its poor white and black electorate two decades ago, alongside pressure from urban elites in Atlanta, and the decline of isolationism due to the success of the Spanish–American War, meant the Populist movement substantially faded in the late 1890s. However, Populism would revive in 1904 when it became clear a conservative would be nominated by the Democratic Party, whilst Watson did not find it difficult to get a somewhat demoralized party’s nomination over William V. Allen.

Vote
Watson would campaign in the state in August, but as Georgia had not voted Republican even during Reconstruction neither major party candidate visited the state. Watson would collapse from his campaigning at the end of September, No polls were taken until October 29, by which time the state was naturally viewed as certain for Parker. Parker would eventually win Georgia with over five-eighths of the vote, although he declined by about three percent from William Jennings Bryan’s performance four years previously. Incumbent Republican President Theodore Roosevelt and Watson ran a very close race for second, with the President edging the Populist for this position.

Results

Results by county

Notes

References

Georgia
1904
1904 Georgia (U.S. state) elections